Pascal Rambeau (born 14 April 1972) is a French sailor. He won a bronze medal in the Star class with Xavier Rohart at the 2004 Summer Olympics.

References

External links
 
 
 

1972 births
Living people
People from Vitry-sur-Seine
French male sailors (sport)
Olympic bronze medalists for France
Olympic medalists in sailing
Star class world champions
Sailors at the 2000 Summer Olympics – Soling
Sailors at the 2004 Summer Olympics – Star
Sailors at the 2008 Summer Olympics – Star
Medalists at the 2004 Summer Olympics
World champions in sailing for France
Sportspeople from Val-de-Marne